Christine Laptuta (born 1951) is a Canadian artist who lives and works in Portland, Oregon.

Her work is included in the collections of the National Gallery of Canada, the Museum of Fine Arts Houston  and the Portland Art Museum.

References

1951 births
Living people
20th-century Canadian women artists
21st-century Canadian women artists
20th-century Canadian photographers
21st-century Canadian photographers
Canadian women photographers
Canadian expatriates in the United States
Artists from Portland, Oregon
20th-century women photographers
21st-century women photographers